Wrapped in a Dream is the twenty-eighth album by Spyro Gyra, recorded and released in 2006. The album peaked at No. 11 on the jazz album chart at Billboard magazine.

Track listing

Track listing and personnel credits from AllMusic

Personnel 

Spyro Gyra
 Jay Beckenstein – alto saxophone, soprano saxophone, tenor saxophone, flute, keyboards, percussion, vocals
 Tom Schuman – keyboards
 Julio Fernández – guitars
 Scott Ambush – bass guitar, double bass

Additional musicians
 Ludwig Afonso – drums
 Josh Dion – drums, percussion
 Cyro Baptista – percussion
 Dave Samuels – marimba, vibraphone
 Eric Oliver – trombone
 Nathan Eklund – trumpet

Production 
 Spyro Gyra – producers
 Chuck Loeb – producer 
 Dave Love – executive producer
 Doug Oberkircher – engineer, mixing 
 Eric Carlinsky – engineer 
 Martin Walters – mixing 
 Phil Magnotti – mixing
 Greg Calbi – mastering 
 Robert Hoffman – art direction, design 
 Jay Beckenstein – photography 
 Cliff Yuhas – photography

Studios 
 Mixed at BearTracks Studios; Big Time Audio (Jonesbourough, Tennessee); Phil Magnotti Studios (Norwalk, Connecticut).
 Mastered at Sterling Sound (New York City, New York).

References

2006 albums
Spyro Gyra albums
Heads Up International albums